Petrosino (Sicilian: Pitrusinu) is a town and comune in Sicily, Italy, administratively part of the province of Trapani, located between the municipalities of Marsala and Mazara del Vallo.

Municipalities of the Province of Trapani